1995 Empress's Cup Final was the 17th final of the Empress's Cup competition. The final was played at Nishigaoka Soccer Stadium in Tokyo on March 3, 1996. Fujita SC Mercury won the championship.

Overview
Fujita SC Mercury won their 1st title, by defeating Yomiuri-Seiyu Beleza 3–2.

Match details

See also
1995 Empress's Cup

References

Empress's Cup
1995 in Japanese women's football